Consuelo Airport is located in the municipality of Consuelo, in the San Pedro de Macorís province of the Dominican Republic. It used to serve as domestic connection travels and military, but now it is only a runway.

See also 
Batey Anita Airport

References

External links 
 

Airports in the Dominican Republic
Buildings and structures in San Pedro de Macorís Province